Büyükcamili can refer to:

 Büyükcamili, Alaca
 Büyükcamili, Bala